Ocoee Dam No. 3 is a hydroelectric dam on the Ocoee River in Polk County, in the U.S. state of Tennessee.  It is one of four dams on the Toccoa/Ocoee River owned and operated by the Tennessee Valley Authority, which built the dam in the early 1940s to meet emergency demands for electricity during World War II.  The dam impounds the  Ocoee No. 3 Reservoir, which stretches  upriver to the Tennessee-Georgia state line.  Ocoee No. 3's powerhouse is actually located several miles downstream from the dam, and is fed by a  conduit that carries water to it from the reservoir.

Location
Both of these mountains are protected by federal wilderness areas which are adjacent to TVA's Ocoee No. 3 reservation boundary. The Ocoee Scenic Byway— which is part of U.S. Route 64— passes just north of the dam.

Capacity

Major recreational releases are typically scheduled for weekends during the summer months.

The water emerges from the tunnel at a point  from the reservoir intake and drops  through a steel penstock to the powerhouse's lone turbine.

Background and construction

The rapid-flowing Ocoee River's hydroelectric potential has been exploited by private interests, namely the Eastern Tennessee Power Company and its successor, the Tennessee Electric Power Company (TEPCO), since the completion of Ocoee Dam No. 1 in late 1911. The U.S. Army Corps of Engineers had surveyed the Ocoee No. 3 dam site in the late 1920s, and TEPCO had already purchased the necessary land and water rights for the dam by the 1930s.

The TVA Act of 1933 created the Tennessee Valley Authority and gave the Authority oversight of the entire Tennessee River watershed, which includes the Ocoee.  In 1939, a U.S. Supreme Court ruling forced TEPCO to sell TVA its assets, which included the tract for Ocoee No. 3.  While TVA identified the Ocoee No. 3 site as part of its Hiwassee Valley surveys in 1934, the idea for the dam received little attention until the outbreak of World War II in Europe sparked a need for increased aluminum production at the ALCOA plant in Alcoa, Tennessee, which required large amounts of electricity.  The Ocoee No. 3 project, along with several other dam projects in the Hiwassee watershed, was authorized on July 16, 1941.  Construction began the following day.

Most of the land necessary for the construction of Ocoee Dam No. 3 and its reservoir had been obtained from TEPCO, and thus no residential or cemetery relocations were necessary.  Work progressed at a steady pace, and the dam was completed on August 15, 1942.  The diversion tunnel was completed in November of the same year, but budget delays prevented the dam's generator from becoming operational until April 30, 1943.

January 2009 sludge release

On January 4, 2009, TVA released a substantial amount of contaminated sludge-like material from the Ocoee No. 3 Reservoir into the Upper Ocoee immediately downstream, killing an undetermined number of fish and covering the river with a  layer of "foul-smelling" sludge as far downstream as the Ocoee No. 2 Reservoir.  The sludge was filled with contaminants— including copper, iron, and zinc— left over from the mining operations that once denuded the Ducktown Basin, which is adjacent to the Ocoee No. 3 reservoir.  The release polluted the Ocoee Whitewater Center, which is two miles (3 km) downstream from Ocoee Dam No. 3.

TVA stated that the release was part of routine maintenance in anticipation of rain showers.  The material was released via the dam's sluice gates, which are located at the bottom of the dam and are typically used for low-level and recreational releases.  On January 12, 2009, in response to the incident, the Tennessee Department of Environment and Conservation issued a notice of violation that ordered TVA to get state approval before using the dam's sluice gates, restore the affected areas, and submit a management plan for sluicing operations at the dam.

References

External links

Ocoee Reservoir No. 3 — official TVA site
Ocoee Dam No. 3 Recreational Release Schedule

Dams on the Hiwassee River
Tennessee Valley Authority dams
Buildings and structures in Polk County, Tennessee
Dams in Tennessee
Hydroelectric power plants in Tennessee
Dams completed in 1943
Energy infrastructure completed in 1943
1943 establishments in Tennessee